The Puerto de las Palomas is a road through two mountains inside the Sierra de Grazalema Natural Park, separating Sierra del Pinar and Sierra del Endrinal.

It is located inside Grazalema municipality (Province of Cádiz) at 1103 meters high.

Views 

From it there is a nice view of the depresión del Boyar and Salto del Cabrero. When sky is clear, also the bay of Cádiz can be seen.

Access 

You can get to it by car (it has a small parking lot), or by two hiking paths:

 Sendero del Salto de Cabrero: it takes you to Salto del Cabrero and Benaocaz
 Sendero de Grazalema: it takes you to Grazalema

Others 

Due to its location and orientation it usually gets covered by snow when temperatures are low in wintertime, being the only place in the province of Cádiz where snow can be seen some days during year.

See also 

 Puerto de las Palomas

Roads in Spain